Harivarman III (Chinese: 施離霞離鼻麻底; pinyin: Shīlí Xiálíbímádǐ; Cham: Śrī Harivarmadeva, Vietnamese: Ha Lê Bạt Ma), was a king of Champa, ruled the kingdom from 1007 to 1018.

In 1008, a civil war between Harivarman III and general Pam̃r Rauṅ broke out in Champa. Pam̃r Rauṅ was suppressed. In 1010, he sent an embassy to Song China to seek investiture, and five years later he sent another embassy. During these envoys, the Cham brought Champa rice to China. 

An inscription dated 1013 records: 

Harivarman III died in 1018 and was succeeded by an unknown ruler.

References

Bibliography
 
  
 

Kings of Champa
11th-century Vietnamese monarchs
1018 deaths